Busbud is a travel website specializing in intercity bus tickets.

Busbud covers buses in North America, South America, Europe, Africa, and Southeast Asia. Busbud is the bus travel booking website with the largest coverage, partnering with over 4,500 bus companies to provide a search engine and a booking platform via its website and mobile app. Busbud serves 21,000 cities with over 3.8 million bus routes in 84 countries.

Company

History
Busbud was founded after CEO and co-founder, LP Maurice, spent 2011 backpacking throughout South America. He faced many difficulties finding and booking reliable inter-city buses throughout the continent and began drafting a business plan on a 10-hour bus ride in Argentina. He then came back to Montreal and founded Busbud with longtime friends, Michael Gradek (CTO and Microsoft Bing veteran) and Frederic Thouin (CAO). The company acts as a reseller, but also provides support on the bus tickets that are sold.

Funding rounds and advisory board
Backed by venture and angel investors, Busbud has an advisory board made up of Expedia Board Member and Managing Partner of InterMedia Partners, Peter Kern; TripAdvisor VP of SEO, Luc Levesque; CEO of the travel startup Luxury Retreats, Joe Poulin, and Orleans Express founder Sylvain Langis.

In May 2013, Busbud completed a seed round financing of $1.2 million, which was co-led by Canadian funds Inovia Capital and Real Ventures.

In July, 2014, Busbud acquired another round of funding of $9 million, co-led by OMERS Ventures and Revolution Ventures. Busbud's plans include growing its in-house team, expanding its route territory, and developing an improved version of their iOS and Android mobile app.

In January 2018, Busbud announced a US$11 Million Series B round of funding, led by iNovia Capital and included new investors Teralys, Claridge and Plaza Ventures, as well as Real Ventures. The capital will be used to fuel technology development, further grow the team and accelerate geographic expansion.

Product and features 
Busbud caters to local and international travelers by offering intercity bus routes in 80 countries. The Busbud platform is available on desktop, mobile web and through its mobile app, available on iOS through the Apple Store and on Android through the Google Play Store. The iOS app was released in April 2015 and the Android app was released in June 2015.

In January 2017, Busbud added 6 more currencies on their platform, bringing the total of available currencies at 30. 

In February 2017, Apple Pay was launched on Busbud's mobile & desktop platforms. Following Apple Pay's success, Busbud launched Google Pay in 2019, allowing users to purchase intercity bus tickets with their favourite payment methods in 80 countries.

In January 2018, interconnected bus routes were released on the Busbud platforms, allowing travelers to find and book itineraries with multiple bus connections from different operators. It allows travelers to combine different routes and operators with one another, unlocking a very large inventory of additional bus route options. 

For any departure offered on Busbud, it is possible to browse reviews and ratings from other Busbud customers who have traveled on that same route.

Inventory  

In 2014, Busbud partnered with Greyhound, the largest North American provider of intercity bus transportation.

A year later, in 2015, Busbud partnered with Flixbus, Europe's leading bus company.  This was followed by an expansion in South America with partnerships with bus companies in Argentina, Chile, Paraguay, Peru, Colombia, Uruguay and Bolivia.

In 2017, Busbud expanded to a new region by adding inventory in Southeast Asia with the addition of bus routes in Thailand, Cambodia, Laos and Vietnam.  

In 2018, Busbud added more inventory in Southern Africa, with partnerships with local bus carriers in South Africa, Namibia, Botswana, Zimbabwe, Zambia, Malawi, and Mozambique. The same year, Busbud added to its already extensive coverage in Europe by expanding to Portugal and partnering with the leading bus company in Portugal.

In August 2018, Busbud integrated one of the largest bus companies in the world, Autobuses de Oriente (ADO), operating in Mexico. Tourists and travellers are able, for the first time, to buy their ADO tickets in their local currency and language, using their preferred method of payment. Busbud was the first international bus booking platform to offer this on the market. 

In November 2018, Busbud acquired Clickbus Turkey, the company which owns and operates Neredennereye.com . This acquisition expanded Busbud's route coverage in Turkey.

References

External links
Official Website

Canadian travel websites
Travel ticket search engines
Companies based in Montreal
Travel and holiday companies of Canada
Online travel agencies
Bus companies of the United States